The Flying Squadron was a Royal Navy squadron  formed at least three times. Its first formation existed from June 1869-November 1870.

First formation, 1869-70 
The first Flying Squadron was established in 1869. It was made up, at various times, of ten wooden ships with auxiliary steam power. The squadron sailed from Plymouth on 19 June 1869. It called at Madeira, South America, South Africa, Melbourne, Sydney, and Hobart in Australia, Auckland, Wellington, and Lyttleton in New Zealand, Japan, Canada Hawaii, and Bahia in Brazil, before returning to England on 15 November 1870.

Between 1866 and 1870,  served in the Pacific with the Commander-in-Chief, China. She joined the Flying Squadron at Valparaiso in Chile, sailing home the rest of the way with them.

Second formation, 1870-72  
The second Flying Squadron was formed in 1870, mostly made up of wooden ships, but including the very new corvette HMS Volage, which circumnavigated the world to "show the flag". The squadron sailed from England on 3 December 1870 and called at Madeira, Brazil, the Cape of Good Hope, and the East Indies, before crossing the Pacific Ocean and returning to England at the end of 1872.

Third formation, 1896 
The third Flying Squadron was a special Royal Navy squadron that operated during 1896.

Following the Jameson Raid in South Africa, the German Emperor Wilhelm II sent a  telegram of support to President Kruger. This led to a war scare in Europe. To ready itself for the possibility of a war with the German Empire, the Royal Navy formed the Particular Service Squadron at Portsmouth, on 14 January 1896. It was soon renamed the Flying Squadron. The squadron was commanded by Rear Admiral Alfred Taylor Dale.

The Flying Squadron was held in readiness for ten months, and briefly was attached to the Mediterranean Fleet in mid-1896.  No war broke out, and the Flying Squadron was disbanded in November 1896.

Notes

References
 
 The cruise round the world of the Flying Squadron, 1869-1870, under the command of Rear-Admiral G. T. Phipps Hornby - rare book in the collection of the National Library of New Zealand

Royal Navy squadrons
19th-century history of the Royal Navy
Military units and formations disestablished in the 1890s